Connecticut's 22nd House of Representatives district elects one member of the Connecticut House of Representatives. It consists of the town of Plainville and part of New Britain. It has been represented by Republican William Petit since 2017.

Recent elections

2020

2018

2016

2014

2012

References

22